Skat may refer to:

Organisations
 Surya Kiran Aerobatic Team, aerobatics display team of the Indian Air Force.
 Savanoriškoji krašto apsaugos tarnyba (SKAT), old name of Lithuanian National Defence Volunteer Forces
 SKAT (tax agency), the Danish tax authority
 SKAT (television) (Bulgarian: Национална телевизия Скат), a Bulgarian national cable television company, with the channels Skat and Skat+

Transport
 Mikoyan Skat, a Russian unmanned combat air vehicle (UCAV)
 Skat (yacht), a luxury yacht launched in 2001
 Skagit Transit, a bus system in Skagit County, Washington

Other
 Skat, the IAU-approved proper name for the star Delta Aquarii
 Skat (card game), Germany's national card game
 Skat (river), a river in Bulgaria

See also
 Scat (disambiguation)
 SKATS, Standard Korean Alphabet Transliteration System